This is a list of federations that are members of International Skating Union (ISU). As of 24 January 2022, there are 101 member federations.

In many countries, figure skating and speed skating are governed by different federations, but both can be members of the ISU; the national federations are ISU members for figure skating, for speed skating or for both. Some of these national federations also govern other sports in their countries, but are not ISU members in that capacity. Apart from the national governing bodies, there are also some old skating clubs which are members in their own rights.

European members (57 national + 2 club members) 
The remainder of this section is a complete list ordered by IOC country codes.

Four continents members (42 national members) 
The remainder of this section are complete lists ordered by IOC country codes.

Africa (4 national members)

Americas (12 national members)

Asia (22 national members)

Oceania (4 national members)

See also 
 International Skating Union
 International figure skating
 Speed skating

References

External links 
 International Skating Union official website

members
 International Skating Union member federations